Rino Della Negra (18 August 1923 – 21 February 1944) was a French footballer who was active in the Resistance during World War II.

Life and career
Della Negra was born in Vimy, France to Italian parents, and grew up in nearby Argenteuil. Playing as a goalkeeper or right winger, he began his football career with local club Argenteuil, before joining Red Star Olympique in mid-1942. Combining his playing career while working in a factory, Della Negra became active in the French Resistance in October 1942, and went into hiding in February 1943. Della Negra, a Communist, was a member of the Manouchian Group; he was wounded in an attack in November 1943, and he was executed by firing squad in February 1944. His execution, along with twenty two fellow résistants is the subject of the famous propaganda poster, l'"Affiche rouge". Before he died, Della Negra wrote a letter to his brother saying "hello and goodbye to Red Star." His brother was present on 21 February 2004 as the club revealed a plaque in his honour.

References

1923 births
1944 deaths
FTP-MOI
People from Vimy
French people of Italian descent
French footballers
Red Star F.C. players
Association football goalkeepers
Association football wingers
Members of the Francs-tireurs et partisans
French people executed by Nazi Germany
Resistance members killed by Nazi Germany
Sportspeople from Pas-de-Calais
French civilians killed in World War II
Footballers from Hauts-de-France